Serhat Coşkun (born July 18, 1987) is a Turkish volleyball player. Coşkun played in the past also for Tokat Belediye Plevne, Arçelik, Bursa Emniyet and Antalya DS.

In 2003, he became international when admitted to the Turkey boy's youth national team.

Serhat Coşkun celebrated his first international champion title with Halkbank Ankara at the Men's CEV Cup 2012–13.

Awards

Individuals
 2012 Men's European Volleyball League Best Scorer

Clubs
 Men's CEV Cup 2012–13 -   Champion, with Halkbank Ankara

References

1987 births
Living people
Sportspeople from Tokat
Turkish men's volleyball players
Halkbank volleyball players
Place of birth missing (living people)
Arçelik volleyballers